National Treasure: Book of Secrets is a 2007 American action-adventure film directed by Jon Turteltaub and produced by Jerry Bruckheimer. It is a sequel to the 2004 film National Treasure and is the second film of the National Treasure franchise. The film stars Nicolas Cage in the lead role, Jon Voight, Harvey Keitel, Ed Harris, Diane Kruger, Justin Bartha, Bruce Greenwood and Helen Mirren. The film premiered in New York City on December 13, 2007, and Walt Disney Studios Motion Pictures released it in North America on December 21, 2007. Critics surveyed by Rotten Tomatoes called it too similar to its predecessor. It grossed $459 million worldwide.

Plot
Five days after the end of the Civil War, John Wilkes Booth and Michael O'Laughlen, both members of the KGC, approach Thomas Gates to decode a message copied into Booth's diary. Thomas recognizes the message as a Playfair cipher, and translates it while Booth departs for Ford's Theatre to assassinate President Abraham Lincoln. Thomas solves the puzzle, realizes Booth and O'Laughlen are trying to help the Confederacy, and rips the cipher's pages from the diary to burn them. O'Laughlen shoots Thomas and flees with the one surviving page fragment, and a dying Thomas tells his son Charles the keyword for the cipher.

More than 140 years later, famed treasure-hunter Ben Gates tells Thomas' story at a Civilian Heroes conference. Black market dealer Mitch Wilkinson produces the page fragment, with Thomas Gates' name next to those of Mary Surratt and Dr. Samuel Mudd. The public believes Thomas helped kill Lincoln, and Ben and his father Patrick set out to disprove it. Using spectral imaging, Ben discovers traces of the cipher on the diary page, that, when solved using the keyword, points to the smaller Statue of Liberty in Paris. Traveling there, Ben and his friend Riley Poole discover an engraving referencing the Resolute desks. They head to London, reluctantly recruiting Ben's estranged girlfriend, Dr. Abigail Chase, along the way. Ben and Abigail sneak a peek at the Buckingham Palace desk, and obtain a Pre-Columbian carved plank from a secret drawer. Mitch, who had secretly cloned Patrick's cell phone in order to track Ben's whereabouts, pursues the trio, and eventually obtains the wooden plank, but not before Ben manages to photograph it.

Back in America, Patrick reluctantly asks his ex-wife, archaeo-lexicologist Dr. Emily Appleton, for help. She claims the carvings reference the "center of the earth", but points out that some of the glyphs are partial. Ben and Abigail convince Abigail's new boyfriend Connor, a White House Curator, to let them see the Resolute Desk in the Oval Office. Ben discovers that the second plank has been replaced by a stamp of an altered Presidential seal, which Riley identifies as the symbol for a secret shared diary, written by Presidents and containing controversial topics such as Watergate, Area 51, and the JFK assassination. Ben's FBI friend Agent Peter Sadusky confirms the book's existence, but warns that no one can read its contents without express permission from the sitting President.

Ben crashes the President's birthday party at Mount Vernon to convince the President to explore a secret tunnel with him. There, Ben activates a secret sliding door, separates the President from his guards, and asks him about the book, while safely leading the President to freedom at the other end of the tunnel. The President sympathetically warns Ben that his actions, while innocently meant, will be interpreted as attempted kidnapping. He then reveals the book is hidden in a safe at the Library of Congress, asking Ben to find out what is on page 47 for him. Pursued by the FBI, Ben, Abigail, and Riley manage a brief look at the book. They find a photograph of the missing plank, and an entry by Calvin Coolidge. He found the plank in 1924, translated it, had it destroyed, and commissioned Gutzon Borglum to carve Mount Rushmore, to hide evidence of a hidden treasure nearby.

After consulting Emily about the glyphs, Ben, Riley, Abigail, and Patrick head to Mount Rushmore. They meet Mitch and Emily there, as Mitch kidnapped her after Ben left. Mitch already has acquired, memorized, and destroyed the final clue, so he can claim the treasure. He helps the group find the entrance of a cave full of booby traps. After briefly getting separated, the group finds a pit containing Cíbola, a Native American city of gold. An ancient dam fails, and it becomes clear one of the group must sacrifice themselves in the quickly flooding cave to hold open the door for the others. Mitch does so, but begs Ben to give him posthumous credit for finding the treasure so he can be in the history books, too.

Ben and the rest return to the surface, where the President prevents Ben from being arrested by claiming Ben saved him from the tunnel's accidental closing. Ben ensures that Mitch receives joint credit for the discovery, rekindles his relationship with Abigail, and clears Thomas Gates' name by proving that Booth had consulted him about the treasure, not the assassination. The scene ends just as Ben is about to reveal to the President what page 47 says, hinting at a third film.

Cast
 Nicolas Cage as Benjamin Franklin "Ben" Gates, treasure hunter, historian and cryptologist
 Justin Bartha as Riley Poole, computer expert and author, Ben's best friend
 Diane Kruger as Dr. Abigail Chase, Director of Document Conservation at the National Archives, Ben's ex-girlfriend
 Jon Voight as Patrick Henry Gates, Ben's father who is divorced from his wife Emily
 Helen Mirren as Dr. Emily Appleton-Gates, professor of Native American Studies, Ben's mother who is divorced from her husband, Patrick
 Ed Harris as Mitchell "Mitch" Wilkinson, a black market dealer 
 Harvey Keitel as FBI Special Agent Peter Sadusky
 Armando Riesco as FBI Special Agent Hendricks
 Alicia Coppola as FBI Special Agent Spellman
 Albert Hall as Dr. Nichols
 Bruce Greenwood as President of the United States
 Ty Burrell as Connor, White House curator, Abigail's new boyfriend.

Randy Travis makes a cameo appearance, performing at the Mount Vernon party. Small supporting parts are played by Joel Gretsch and Billy Unger as Gates's ancestors Thomas Gates and Charles Carroll Gates; Christian Camargo as John Wilkes Booth; Brent Briscoe as Michael O'Laughlen; and Zachary Gordon as a boy who gets into a heated argument with Gates over a Lincoln conspiracy. In France, Guillaume Gallienne and Scali Delpeyrat appear (uncredited) as the French policemen.

Production 

It was stated in the first film's commentary that there were no plans for a sequel, but due to the first film's impressive box-office performance (earning $347.5 million worldwide), a sequel was given the go-ahead in 2005. Challenges associated with the quick turnaround time between the film's greenlighting and its 2007 release are explored in detail in the 2023 nonfiction book National Treasure Hunt: One Step Short of Crazy, authored by franchise experts Aubrey R. Paris and Emily M. Black (unaffiliated with the Walt Disney Company).

Many scenes of historic locations were filmed on location, including the scenes at Mount Vernon and Mount Rushmore. Filming at Mount Rushmore took longer than initially scheduled, due to inclement weather and the decision to change the setting of additional scenes to the area around Mount Rushmore to take advantage of the Black Hills backdrop. The scene at the beginning of the film in which Riley is signing copies of his book of the Templar Treasure until his Ferrari is confiscated by the IRS took place at the street level Borders Group bookstore of Garfinckel's Department Store.

Soundtrack

The soundtrack to National Treasure: Book of Secrets was released on December 18, 2007.

Reception

Box office
National Treasure: Book of Secrets grossed $44.8 million in its opening week, placing at #1 at the box office. It remained in first at the box office for two more weeks, grossing $35.7 million and $20.1 million, respectively, until it was dethroned by The Bucket List ($19.4 million).

The film grossed $220 million in North America and $237.4 million in other territories for a total gross of $457.4 million, against a budget of $130 million, making it the ninth-highest-grossing film of 2007, and the highest-grossing film in the series. It took 38 days to outgross the first film ($347.5 million).

Critical response

On Rotten Tomatoes the film holds an approval rating of 36% based on 130 reviews, with an average rating of 4.80/10. The site's critical consensus reads, "A talented cast goes to waste in the improbable National Treasure: Book of Secrets, which is eerily similar to the first film." On Metacritic, the film has a weighted average score of 48 out of 100, based on 26 critics, indicating "mixed or average reviews". Audiences polled by CinemaScore gave the film an average grade of "A−" on an A+ to F scale.

Roger Ebert gave the film 2 out of 4 stars.

British film critic Peter Bradshaw of The Guardian disputed the implication of British support for the Confederate side in the American Civil War.

Accolades 
The film earned two Razzie Award nominations including Worst Actor for Nicolas Cage (also for Ghost Rider and Next) and Worst Supporting Actor for Jon Voight (also for Bratz: The Movie, September Dawn, and Transformers), but lost both categories to Eddie Murphy for Norbit.

The film was nominated for Best Movie at the 2008 MTV Movie Awards, but lost to Transformers.

Home media
National Treasure: Book of Secrets was released on DVD, UMD, and Blu-ray Disc on May 20, 2008 (June 2, 2008 in the UK). In the opening weekend, 3,178,631 DVD units were sold, bringing in $50,826,310 in revenue. As of August 2009, 5,873,640 DVD units have been sold, generating revenue of $93,132,076. This does not include Blu-ray Disc sales or DVD rentals.

The film has been retitled National Treasure 2: Book of Secrets for all three releases. The film's official website has also been changed accordingly.

A special edition, called the "National Treasure Presidential Edition", contains National Treasure and National Treasure 2: Book of Secrets inside a letter book which is a replica of the Presidents' secret book from National Treasure 2: Book of Secrets.

Novelizations
Disney Press published an official novelization of the screenplay titled National Treasure 2: Book of Secrets The Junior Novel on November 6, 2007. Parts of the story in the novel version differ slightly from what was actually filmed, owing to changes being made in the screenplay prior to and during production. For example, in the novel, Ben and Abigail photograph the wooden plank found hidden in the Queen's desk and leave it behind, with the car chase following. However, in the movie, they take the plank with them on the chase.

Also published on the same day as the official novelization was a companion youth novel Changing Tides: A Gates Family Mystery by Catherine Hapka. Its story is set in England in the year 1612 and is the first in a series of planned historical novels about the Gates family. The epilogue from Changing Tides is included at the back of the National Treasure book. The second youth novel by Hapka, Midnight Ride: A Gates Family Mystery, was published on March 8, 2008.

Accuracy

The group mentioned in the film as being behind the assassination of Abraham Lincoln and pursuing the city of gold, The Knights of the Golden Circle, had actually disbanded in 1863. It was based in Cincinnati, Ohio, where its founder George W. L. Bickley resided. Though a native of Virginia, Bickley had actually been known for being an adventurer and also bad with finances. His main focus was also not on preserving the Confederate States of America (CSA), but restoring slavery in southern neighboring countries which he wanted to make part of a proposed nation dubbed "Golden Circle." While some members of the group would join the Confederate Army, Bickley was more focused on colonizing parts of northern Mexico as slave states. He would not join the Confederate Army until after his expeditions in Mexico faltered in 1863. Soon afterwards, the organization was exposed and many members were arrested while attempting to steal numerous gold shipments from San Francisco Bay.

Following the outbreak of the American Civil War numerous Golden Circle members were not focused on fighting Union states north of the Mason-Dixon Line as the film suggests, but were pre-occupied with making the Union territory of New Mexico a part of the proposed Golden Circle nation as well. Those who operated in the North mostly aligned with Copperhead politicians who preferred a negotiated end to the war. Bickley, who served the Confederate Army for months as a surgeon to General Braxton Bragg, would be captured in Indiana in July 1863 on charges of being a Confederate spy and remained in house arrest until October 1865. The month before his arrest, Bickley abandoned the Confederate Army after preferring to settle in Tennessee. Former members would also name its successor organization the Order of the Sons of Liberty in 1864, the year before Lincoln's assassination. This successor organization was exposed the same year it was founded and members were arrested and tried for treason.

The film's suggestion that Britain wanted a strong alliance with the Confederate States of America was also highly unlikely. Efforts which were made by Confederate Secretary of State Judah P. Benjamin to persuade Britain to simply recognize the Confederate States of America proved unsuccessful.

The wooden plank map hidden within both Resolute Desks that leads to the location of Cíbola would have been of no use to the Confederacy, as the desks were constructed and delivered between the years 1879 and 1880, some 15 years after the American Civil War concluded and the disbandment of the Confederate states. Similarly, the clues left by Édouard Laboulaye would have been equally of no use, as the earliest models of the Statue of Liberty and all subsequent replicas were all constructed no earlier than 1875, 10 years after the end of the Civil War.

Future
In May 2008 Jon Turteltaub confirmed that there would be additional National Treasure movies, but acknowledged that the creative team would take their time on the second sequel. That same year, The Walt Disney Company registered the IP for the domain names for future films.

In October 2013, Turteltaub stated that all individuals involved with the first two movies want to make a third film. He further stated that the delays have been due to working out the script, and that he expected the film to begin production in 2015. By 2014, producer Jerry Bruckheimer announced that a new team of writers were working on the script. In May 2016, Nicolas Cage confirmed that the script was still being sorted out. By September 2017, it was revealed that a script had been finished, but that the executives at Walt Disney Studios Motion Pictures were not satisfied with the story. In July 2018, Turtletaub stated that the script was "close", but the studios still weren't going to green-light production yet.

In January 2020, after years of development hell, it was announced that a third film was officially moving forward with a script from Chris Bremner. Jerry Bruckheimer will return as producer and the original cast is expected to return as well.

In April 2022, Nicolas Cage was hosting an AMA (Ask Me Anything) thread on Reddit where he commented on the possibility of future installments: "No, the priority was to turn it into a TV show so I would say probably not."

At the D23 Expo of September 2022 it was announced a sequel TV series will be released on the Disney+ streaming service. The title of the series was also confirmed respectively - National Treasure: Edge of History. Lisette Alexis was confirmed to play the lead role of Jess, a 20-year old DREAMer who sets out on an adventure to uncover her family's history. Cage confirmed he would not be reprising his role for the series. Jerry Bruckheimer was confirmed to serve as executive producer for the series. The series had a two-episode premiere on December 14, 2022.

See also 
 Assassination of Abraham Lincoln
 Playfair cipher

References

External links

 
 
 
 

2000s adventure films
2007 films
American adventure films
American sequel films
Black Hills
Cryptography in fiction
Cultural depictions of Abraham Lincoln
2000s English-language films
Fictional depictions of Abraham Lincoln in film
Films about fictional presidents of the United States
Films about secret societies
Films directed by Jon Turteltaub
Films produced by Jerry Bruckheimer
Films scored by Trevor Rabin
Films set in 1865
Films set in 2007
Films set in London
Films set in Paris
Films set in South Dakota
Films set in the White House
Films set in Virginia
Films set in Washington, D.C.
Films shot in Maryland
Films shot in South Dakota
Films with screenplays by Ted Elliott
Films with screenplays by Terry Rossio
Mount Rushmore
Saturn Films films
Treasure hunt films
Walt Disney Pictures films
National Treasure (film series)
2000s American films